Paint Rock Independent School District is a public school district based in Paint Rock, Texas (USA).

Academic achievement
In 2009, the school district was rated "recognized" by the Texas Education Agency.

Schools
The district has one school that serves students in grades pre-kindergarten through twelve.

Special programs

Athletics
Paint Rock High School plays six-man football.

See also

List of school districts in Texas

References

External links
Paint Rock ISD

School districts in Concho County, Texas